Dubraj is a variety of rice. It is an aromatic short to medium grain rice. It is a traditional Indian cultivar with intermediate amylose and gelatinization temperature. It is most common in Madhya Pradesh and Chhattisgarh, mainly Bilaspur.

References

External links
Rice biochemistry comparison

Rice varieties